The 1987–88 Yugoslav Ice Hockey League season was the 46th season of the Yugoslav Ice Hockey League, the top level of ice hockey in Yugoslavia. 10 teams participated in the league, and Jesenice have won the championship.

Final ranking
Jesenice
Olimpija
Partizan
Medveščak
Vojvodina Novi Sad
Red Star
Celje
Kranjska Gora
Bosna
Skopje

External links
Season on eurohockey.com
Yugoslav Ice Hockey League seasons

1987-88
Yugo
1987–88 in Yugoslav ice hockey